The 2020 Chinese Figure Skating Championships were held from September 14–16, 2019 in Changchun, Jilin. Medals were awarded in the disciplines of men's singles, ladies' singles, pair skating, and ice dance at the senior and junior levels.

Athletes will compete again at the 2020 National Winter Games held in February in Inner Mongolia.

Medal summary

Senior

Junior

Senior-level results

Senior men

Senior ladies

Senior pairs

Senior ice dance

References

Chinese Figure Skating Championships
2019 in figure skating
Chinese Figure Skating Championships, 2020
Sport in Changchun